Cynthia Mary Brooke, Viscountess Brookeborough,  (née Sergison; 10 May 1897 – 2 March 1970) was a British peeress and the wife of the first Viscount Brookeborough, Prime Minister of Northern Ireland from 1943 to 1963.

Cynthia was born in Cuckfield, Sussex, to Captain Charles Warden Sergison and the Hon. Florence Emma Louise Hanbury-Tracy, daughter of Charles Hanbury-Tracy, 4th Baron Sudeley. In 1919, she married Viscount Brookeborough (9 June 1888 – 18 August 1973), son of Sir Arthur Douglas Brooke, 4th Bt. and Gertrude Isabella Batson, on 3 June 1919. Lord and Lady Brookeborough had three sons, two of whom were killed in action during World War II. Only one son of the three survived his parents. They were:

Lieutenant Basil Julian David Brooke (18 April 1920 - March 1943 (Killed in action) 
John Warden Brooke, 2nd Viscount Brookeborough (9 November 1922 – 5 March 1987) 
Lieutenant Henry Alan Brooke (29 October 1923 - April 1945) (Killed in action)

In World War II, she was Senior Commandant of the Auxiliary Territorial Service. Brooke was styled as Viscountess Brookeborough from 1 July 1952, when her husband was created Viscount Brookeborough. In the 1959 Birthday Honours, she was invested as a Dame Commander of the Order of the British Empire (DBE), for public services in Northern Ireland.

Death
She died on 2 March 1970, aged 72. After her death, Lord Brookeborough married Sarah Eileen Bell, daughter of Henry Healey, of Belfast, and widow of Cecil Armstrong Calvert, FRCS, former director of neurosurgery at the Royal Victoria Hospital, Belfast.

References

1897 births
1970 deaths
British Army personnel of World War II
British viscountesses
Dames Commander of the Order of the British Empire
Auxiliary Territorial Service officers
Place of birth missing
Place of death missing